Polypoetes suffumosa is a moth of the family Notodontidae. It is found in Argentina.

It is one of the smallest species in the genus Polypoetes with a forewing length of 9–12 mm.

References

Moths described in 1902
Notodontidae of South America